Stephen Hughes may refer to:
 Stephen Hughes (politician) (born 1952), British MEP for North East England
 Stephen Hughes (footballer, born 1919) (1919–1981), English football defender, played for clubs including Liverpool, Oldham Athletic and New Brighton
 Stephen Hughes (footballer, born 1976), English football midfielder, played for clubs including Arsenal, Coventry City and Walsall
 Stephen Hughes (footballer, born 1982), Scotland international footballer, played for Rangers, Leicester City, Motherwell, Norwich City
 Stephen Hughes (footballer, born 1984), English football midfielder, played for Brentford and several non-League clubs
 Steven Hughes (1954–2000), American artist
 Steve Hughes, Australian musician and comedian

See also
 Stephen Rahman-Hughes (born 1970), English-Malaysian actor and singer